A197 may refer to:
 A197 road (England), a road connecting Clifton, Northumberland and Newbiggin-by-the-Sea
 Jalan Kuala Gula, a road in Perak, Malaysia, connecting Jalan Gula and Kuala Gula
 Jalan Semanggol, a road in Perak, Malaysia, connecting Jalan Gula-Jalan Semanggol and Bukit Merah